Song is a district, in Kapit Division, Sarawak, Malaysia.

References